Cora aurea is a species of damselfly in the family Polythoridae known commonly as the black-banded bannerwing. It is endemic to Colombia, where it has been noted at only three locations.

References

Polythoridae
Endemic fauna of Colombia
Insects of South America
Insects described in 1918
Taxonomy articles created by Polbot
Taxobox binomials not recognized by IUCN